The Box or BBC Box (BIC code: NYKU8210506) was a single ISO intermodal container that was tracked by BBC News between September 2008 and April 2009, as part of a project to study international trade and globalisation. The Box was fitted with tracking equipment and painted in a special one-off livery.

The tracking project was launched on 8 September 2008. The project tracked a standard  shipping container as it was transported by its owner, Nippon Yusen Kaisha (NYK) shipping line using intermodal freight transport with various cargoes. An on-board GPS unit tracked the Box's location and this was used to update a map showing the current location and previous route. If the container's GPS or communications signal was obstructed (such as having been stacked too far inside the ship's hold), the ship's own GPS location was used to manually update a map. The tracking unit suffered technical problems during December 2008.

The Box was painted in a special BBC paint scheme and was named after the book The Box: How the Shipping Container Made the World Smaller and the World Economy Bigger, which covers the effects of containerisation. The project was assisted by the Container Shipping Information Service.

Following the end of the project in 2009, the shipping container was donated by its owner, Nippon Yusen Kaisha (NYK) to a charity to be turned into a soup kitchen.

Cargoes

The box started off empty, travelling to its first destination under the BBC branding. The first cargo was a consignment of whisky from a Glasgow-based bottling plant to Shanghai, China. On arrival in Shanghai, the Box was met and reported on by British school pupils on a trip to China.

 (Empty) from Southampton Maritime, England to a dry port at Coatbridge, Scotland (by rail, behind Freightliner 66594 NYK Spirit of Kyoto)
 to Paisley, Scotland (by road)
 Chivas Regal Scotch Whisky from Paisley via Greenock, Scotland (by road)
 via Port of Belfast, Northern Ireland, to Port of Southampton (on board )
 via Suez Canal and Gulf of Aden; reloaded at Port of Singapore, to Port of Shanghai, China (on board )
 Tape measures, cosmetics, and gardening products for Big Lots from Port of Shanghai via Japan and Pacific Ocean to Port of Los Angeles, United States (on board );
 via New Jersey (by rail)
 to Pennsylvania (by road)
 Ink, spearmint flavouring, additives, and polyester fibre from New York, (on board , IMO9106807, formerly Eagle I)

 to Santos, Brazil (by sea)
 Monosodium glutamate and auto parts from Santos via Cape of Good Hope and Singapore (on board , IMO9178288, Callsign A8HJ6)
 reloaded at Port of Hong Kong to Port of Yokohama, Japan (on board , IMO9355408, Callsign 9VFW9)
 Various (consolidated cargo) from Yokohama 15 August 2009 (on board , IMO9117129, Callsign HSAG2)
 to Laem Chabang, Thailand (expected: 23 August 2009)
 Tinned catfood  from Lat Krabang, Bangkok, Thailand on 25 September 2009, due to arrive at Southampton, United Kingdom on 21 October 2009

Later arrived in Southampton on 22 October at around 3am, unloaded with crane L, being driven by Lee Harfield, the same driver who had loaded it when it left Southampton.

GPS tracking stopped on 4 April 2009, shortly after passing Mauritius.

Similar projects
 A 2007 book, Around the World in 40 Feet; Two Hundred Days in the Life of a 40FT NYK Shipping Container, written by Richard Cook and Marcus Oleniuk, detailed the journey of another NYK container.
 Logistics, a 2012 experimental film, follows the production and shipping associated with a pedometer over the course of 35 days. Logistics is considered to be the longest film ever produced.

References

External links
 BBC News home page for The Box project
 Live updating map of the Box's position
 Image of The Box

BBC
Intermodal containers
2008 in transport
2009 in transport